Badminton Ireland, formally the Badminton Union of Ireland, is the national governing body for the sport of badminton in Ireland and Northern Ireland. As of January 2019, there are more than 16,000 registered players.

History
Founded as the Badminton Union of Ireland in 1899, it later became one of the founding members of International Badminton Federation in 1934. The union consists of four branches which come from Provinces of Ireland: Connacht, Leinster, Ulster, and Munster.

Tournaments
 Irish Open, one of the oldest badminton tournaments, first started in 1902.

Olympic Athletes 

 Scott Evans - Beijing 2008, London 2012, Rio 2016
 Chloe Magee - Beijing 2008, London 2012, Rio 2016
 Sonja McGinn - Sydney 2000
 Nhat Nguyen - Tokyo 2021

References

National members of the Badminton World Federation
Badminton in Ireland
Badminton
1899 establishments in Ireland